The 2012–13 James Madison Dukes men's basketball team represented James Madison University during the 2012–13 NCAA Division I men's basketball season. The Dukes, led by fifth year head coach Matt Brady, played their home games at the James Madison University Convocation Center and were members of the Colonial Athletic Association. They finished the season 21–15, 11–7 in CAA play to finish in fourth place. They were champions of the CAA tournament, defeating Northeastern in the championship game, to earn an automatic bid to the 2013 NCAA tournament. They defeated Long Island in the first four-round before losing in the second round to Indiana.

Roster

Schedule

|-
!colspan=9| Exhibition

|-
!colspan=9| Regular season

|-
!colspan=9| 2013 CAA men's basketball tournament

|-
!colspan=9| 2013 NCAA tournament

References

James Madison Dukes men's basketball seasons
James Madison
James Madison
James Madison Dukes men's basketball team
James Madison Dukes men's basketball team